Roseburg High School is a public high school in Roseburg, Oregon, United States.

Campus 

Completed in 1926, the "Heritage Building," once referred to as the "Main Building", is the oldest on campus. Constructed out of concrete in a cow pasture known as "Bellows Field," the Heritage Building originally consisted of 15 classrooms, a gymnasium and an auditorium.

At three stories high, the tallest building on campus is referred to as "The Commons." Completed in 1964, it is located at the center of the campus and houses the Library/Media Center at the ground floor.

In 2001 a major remodel began that included the erection of three new buildings and the demolition of two old buildings. The Fitness Gymnasium located to the south of the Heritage Building was completed in 2002. The Fine Arts Building was completed in the summer of 2003, housing the Rose Theatre, the cafeteria and the fine arts department. The Main Building was completed in 2004 and is the location of the front office, counseling center and career center.

Athletics 
Roseburg High School athletics have a decorated history in football, wrestling, and other sports.  In the 1960's and early 1970's Roseburg was a tennis powerhouse winning 12 state championships under Coach Al Hoffman (Hoffman coached from 1949 to 1973). The outdoor building at the Umpqua Valley Tennis Center is named after Hoffman. Beyond tennis, Roseburg has also produced some of the top high school wrestlers in the country, sending students to several universities and garnering championships in 1974, 2007, 2008, 2010, 2011, 2012, 2014, 2015, 2016, 2017, 2018, and 2019 under Steve Lander. 

Roseburg High School's football team made the USAToday rankings for the top 25 football teams in the nation in both the 1995 and 1996 seasons under head coach Thurman Bell. During those seasons, the team also won state championships. Under Thurman Bell's replacement Dave Heuberger, Roseburg High School achieved made it to the quarterfinals of the OSAA (Oregon School Activities Association) 6A bracket in the 2021 season.

Academics
In 2008, 71% of the school's seniors received a high school diploma. Of 598 students, 427 graduated, 127 dropped out, and 44 were still in high school the following year. In the graduating class of 2021, over 89% of the graduating class completed their diploma or GED, beating the state average in a year that saw most schools decline.

Shooting incident
At 7:45am on February 23, 2006, 14-year-old freshman Vincent Wayne Leordoro shot and critically wounded 16-year-old Joseph Monti in the school's courtyard. Two students followed the shooter and flagged down a police car as he walked away from school. Police confronted him at a nearby restaurant parking lot, where he put a gun to his head before surrendering. School administrators hired security guards as a result of the incident. Leodoro was sentenced to be held until he was 25 years old.

Notable alumni
 Paul Brothers - football player
 Jamie Burke - MLB baseball player
 Troy Calhoun - head coach of the United States Air Force Academy football team
 David Kennerly - Pulitzer prize-winning photographer and Presidential Photographer for Gerald Ford  
 Matthew Lessner - director and screenwriter
 Kyle Loomis - football punter
 Nancy Norton - U.S. Navy vice admiral
 Alek Skarlatos - Oregon Army National Guardsman, recipient of the Knights of the Legion of Honour
 Craig Tanner - film director, film producer, and editor
 Chris Thompson - US Olympic Swimmer, Bronze Medalist Sydney 2000
 ZZ Ward - musician

References

1899 establishments in Oregon
Buildings and structures in Roseburg, Oregon
Educational institutions established in 1899
High schools in Douglas County, Oregon
Public high schools in Oregon